Isari Velan was an Indian actor, politician and former Member of the Legislative Assembly of Tamil Nadu. His daughter Azaghu Tamil Selvi is a doctor who is also an educationist. His son Ishari K. Ganesh is an educationist who acted in few films and also produced and distributed films. Velan's grandson Varun is also an actor who acted in films like Thalaivaa, Vanamagan and Bogan.

Political career 
He was elected to the Tamil Nadu legislative assembly from Dr. Radhakrishnan Nagar constituency as an Anna Dravida Munnetra Kazhagam candidate in 1977 election.

Filmography 
This is a partial filmography. You can expand it.

References 

All India Anna Dravida Munnetra Kazhagam politicians
Living people
Indian male film actors
Male actors in Tamil cinema
Indian male comedians
Tamil comedians
Tamil politicians
Year of birth missing (living people)
Tamil Nadu MLAs 1977–1980